Pirogovo is a rural locality (a selo) in Alexeyevsky District, Belgorod Oblast, Russia. The population was 189 as of 2010. There are 4 streets.

Geography 
Pirogovo is located 27 km east of Alexeyevka (the district's administrative centre) by road. Vorobyovo is the nearest rural locality.

References 

Rural localities in Alexeyevsky District, Belgorod Oblast
Biryuchensky Uyezd